Bollywood may refer to:

 Hindi cinema in India in general
 Cinema of India in general
 Bollywood (tree), any of a number of trees
 MBC Bollywood, the Bollywood channel of MBC, a Middle-East and North-African free-to-air TV channel of Pakistani and Indian teledramas and films
 Bollywood Film Festival, an annual film festival of Prague, Czechia

See also

 Bollywood/Hollywood, a 2002 Canadian film
 Bollywood & Beyond (disambiguation)
 Tollywood (disambiguation), including cinema of India
 Kollywood (disambiguation), including cinema of India
 Hollywood (disambiguation)
 
 Bolly (disambiguation)
 Wood (disambiguation)